Chipmunks in Low Places is a country album written by John Boylan and Andrew Gold and performed by Alvin and the Chipmunks. It features cover songs as well as original material. Released on September 29, 1992, the album was certified Platinum by the RIAA, becoming the group's first platinum record and making it the Chipmunks' best-selling album. The album reached number 21 on the Billboard 200, becoming their first album to chart in ten years. The album also managed to peak at No. 6 on Billboards Top Country Albums, making it the highest peaking album for the group on the chart. In Canada, the album peaked at number 9, and was number 49 in the Top 50 Country albums of 1993.

Storyline 
Alvin is broke and is feeling "so blue" about life in general. He cheers himself up to his favorite country songs [track 1]. He brings in his favorite singers to sing with him in his latest album, but every duet ends with an argument [tracks 2-3]. His girlfriend Brittany is in the final process of breaking up with him [tracks 4 and 10]. Coming home to a dirty room, he is so depressed after seeing his guests imitate his mischief that he loses touch with reality and sinks into fairy tale addiction [track 5], refusing to clean his room in the process. At Charlie Daniels's urging, he starts to be nice to his brothers, but the conversation between them results in the unloading of a lot of unpleasant memories [track 6]. During a concert in Nashville, he cannot resist destroying his and his brothers' instruments [tracks 7-8]. After this he tries to hook up with Waylon Jennings, but Mr. Jennings turns down his overtures and badmouths his natural behavior [track 9]. Having scared everyone else away, he utters one final, futile act of self-indignation [track 11].

Track listing 

Source: allmusic

Personnel

Musicians and vocalists 
 Alvin Seville – lead and backing vocals
 Simon Seville – lead and backing vocals
 Theodore Seville – lead and backing vocals
 B. James Lowry – guitar
 Roy Huskey, Jr. – bass guitar
 Eddie Bayers – drums
 Steve Nathan – keyboards
 Owen Hale – percussion
 Buddy Emmons – steel guitar
 Rob Hajacos – fiddle
 Andrew Gold – keyboards, guitars, and backing vocals
 John Boylan – keyboards and guitars
 Billy Burnette – guitar and backing vocals
 Rainy Haynes – backing vocals
 Sherwood Ball – backing vocals
 Gerry Beckley – backing vocals

Production credits 
 John Boylan – producer
 Janice Karman – producer
 Ross Bagdasarian – producer
 Warren Peterson – engineer (Nashville unit)
 Greg Parker – assistant engineer (Nashville unit)
 Traci Sterling – production coordinator (Nashville unit)
 Paul Grupp – engineer (Los Angeles unit)
 Richard Markowitz – assistant engineer (Los Angeles unit)
 Denice Ferguson – production coordinator (Los Angeles unit)
 Teri Wegel – production coordinator (Los Angeles unit)
 Steve "Boots" Karman – art direction
 Tony Le Bruno – cover photo
 Sandra – cover animation art
 Kim Ellis – cover animation art
 Brian Mendelsohn - Digital Recording/Editing

Charts

References 

1992 albums
Alvin and the Chipmunks albums
Albums produced by John Boylan (record producer)
Sony Wonder albums
Columbia Records albums